Ussa is a local government area in Taraba State, Nigeria. Its headquarters is in the town of Lissam. Ussa borders the Republic of Cameroon in the south; the Donga River forms its northern boundary. Ussa was created in 1996 during the regime of General Sani Abacha after an earlier attempt failed in 1983, Aticwo (kpambo), Rufu, Lumbu, Fikyu, Acha, Kpambo Puri, are some of the district councils within Ussa.

Kuteb people are the  ethnicity  located in large population here.

The postal code of the area is 671.

References

Local Government Areas in Taraba State